At least four ships of the Royal Navy have borne the name HMS Haughty:

 was a 12-gun gunboat built at Gravesend in 1797 and disposed of in 1802.
 was a 14-gun gun-brig built in 1804. She was disposed of in 1816.
 was an  wood screw gunboat launched in 1856 and sold in 1867.
 was a  "Twenty-seven knotter" destroyer.  She was launched in 1895 and sold for scrap in 1912.

Royal Navy ship names